Choi Chung-Sik (최충식, 19 September 1931 - 24 June 2012) is a Korean former long-distance runner who competed in the 1952 Summer Olympics and in the 1956 Summer Olympics.

References

1931 births
2012 deaths
Korean male long-distance runners
Olympic athletes of South Korea
Athletes (track and field) at the 1952 Summer Olympics
Athletes (track and field) at the 1956 Summer Olympics
Asian Games medalists in athletics (track and field)
Athletes (track and field) at the 1954 Asian Games
Asian Games gold medalists for South Korea
Medalists at the 1954 Asian Games